Amblyseius sparsus is a species of mite in the family Phytoseiidae.

References

sparsus
Articles created by Qbugbot
Animals described in 1990